Urban theory describes the economic, political and social processes which affect the formation and development of cities.

Overview
Theoretical discourse has often polarized between economic determinism and cultural determinism with scientific or technological determinism adding another contentious issue of reification. Studies across eastern and western nations have suggested that certain cultural values promote economic development and that the economy in turn changes cultural values.  Urban historians were among the first to acknowledge the importance of technology in the city. It embeds the single most dominant characteristic of a city; its networked character perpetuated by information technology. Regardless of the deterministic stance (economic, cultural or technological), in the context of globalization, there is a mandate to mold the city to complement the global economic structure and urbanomics gains ascendancy.

Political processes 
Lewis Mumford described monumental architecture as an "expression of power" seeking to produce "respectful terror". Gigantism, geometry, and order are characteristic of cities such as Washington, D.C., New Delhi, Beijing and Brasília.

Economic capital and globalization
The Industrial Revolution was accompanied by urbanization in Europe and the United States in the 19th century. Friedrich Engels studied Manchester, which was being transformed by the cotton industry. He noted how the city was divided into the wealthy and working class areas, which were physically separated so that one could not see any of the latter from the former. The city was therefore a function of capital.

Georg Simmel studied the effect of the urban environment on the individuals living in cities, arguing in The Metropolis and Mental Life that the increase in human interaction affected relationships. The activity and anonymity of the city led to a 'blasé attitude' with reservations and aloofness by urban denizens. This was also driven by the market economy of the city, which corroded traditional norms. However, people in cities were also more tolerant and sophisticated.

Henri Lefebvre argued in the 1960s and 1970s that urban space is dominated by the interests of corporations and capitalism.  Private places such as shopping centres and office buildings dominated over public space. The economic relations could be seen in the city itself, with wealthy areas being far more opulent than the run-down parts of the poor. To fix this, a right to the city needed to be asserted to give everyone a say on urban space.

Economic sustainability
In fact, urbanomics can spillover beyond the city parameters. The process of globalization extends its territories into global city regions. Essentially, they are territorial platforms (metropolitan extensions from key cities, chain of cities linked within a state territory or across inter-state boundaries and arguably; networked cities and/or regions cutting across national boundaries) interconnected in the globalized economy. Some see global city-regions rather than global cities as the nodes of a global network.

The rules of engagement are built on economic sustainability – the ability to continuously generate wealth. The cornerstones of this economic framework are the following ‘4C’ attributes: (1) currency flow for trading, (2) commoditization of products and services in supply chain management, (3) command centre function in orchestrating interdependency and monitoring executions and (4) consumerization. Unless, decoupling the economy from these attributes can be demonstrated; symbolic capital expressions as legitimate as they may be; must accept the domineering status of urbanomics.

Revisiting economic measurements
Arguably, the culprit of this economic entrapment is the high-consumption lifestyle synonymous with affluence.  The resolve may well be that ‘less is more’ and that true welfare lies not in a rise in production and income. As such, Gross Domestic Product (GDP) is increasingly being questioned as inaccurate and inadequate. GDP includes things that do not contribute to sustainable growth and excludes non-monetary benefits that improve the welfare of the people.  In response, alternative measures have been proposed such as the Genuine Progress Indicator (GPI) and the Index of Sustainable Welfare - ISEW.

See also
 MONU - magazine on urbanism
Rural economics
Urban economics
Urban decay
Urban development
Urban planning
Urban studies
Urban vitality

References

External links
 MA Theories of Urban Practice program in New York City

Notes
Papageorgiou, Y. & Pines, D. (1999)An Essay on Urban Economic Theory, London: Kluwer Academic Publishers
Steingart, G. (2008) The War for Wealth. The True Story of Globalization or Why the Flat World is Broken, New York: McGraw Hill
  Aseem Inam, Designing Urban Transformation    New York and London:  Routledge, 2013. .

Urban planning
Urban economics